Pico is an unincorporated community in Botetourt County, Virginia, United States.

References

Unincorporated communities in Botetourt County, Virginia
Unincorporated communities in Virginia